Abbasabad (also Romanized as ‘Abbāsābād; also known as ‘Abbāsābād-e Peghar and ‘Abbāsābād-e Pegharī) is a village in Olya Rural District, in the Central District of Ardestan County, Isfahan Province, Iran. At the 2006 census, its population was 112, in 35 families.

References 

Populated places in Ardestan County